The sack of Kiev took place on 8–12 March 1169 when a coalition of 11 princes, assembled by the prince of Vladimir-Suzdal, Andrey Bogolyubsky, and led by his son Mstislav Andreyevich during the dynastic fight for power in Rus' between the Volyn and Suzdal Monomakhovichi.

The defense of Kiev was headed by the prince Mstislav II of Kiev.

Background 

After the death of the Kievan prince Mstyslav the Great, son of Vladimir Monomakh, in 1132 the process of disintegration of Kievan Rus' accelerated substantially and the struggle for power between various descendants of Yaroslav the Wise intensified.

Anyone who conquered Kyiv not only received the title of "Grand Prince of Kyiv", but could also claim leadership in the Rurik dynasty. As the metropolitan lived in Kyiv, and the main churches and monasteries were located there, it remained if not a political, but an indisputable cultural and religious center of all Rus'. Even with the reduction of its influence, Kyiv and the surrounding lands remained one of the most developed and densely populated areas of the state. 
After the death of Yuri Dolgorukiy in 1157, local boyars invited a representative of the Chernihiv Olgoviches, Izyaslav Davydovych, to the Grand Prince table in Kyiv. However, his reign was short-lived: in 1161 prince Izyaslav died near the walls of Belgorod in a battle with Mstyslav Izyaslavych. After Izyaslav Davydovych's death, Rostyslav Mstyslavych, who had previously ruled Smolensk for 32 years and was the founder of the Smolensk dynasty of princes, took the Grand Prince table. He managed to organize several successful campaigns against the nomads. Equally great is the prince's merit in calming the inter-princely quarrels for a while. He managed to restore the prestige of the Grand Prince government and spread its influence to a large part of the lands of the Rurik. No less important is the fact that he managed to achieve this without resorting to the force of arms. He entered the history of the Old Kyiv state as one of its most peaceful rulers.

After the death of Rostyslav, the princely quarrels were restored. According to their position of family seniority, Volodymyr Mstyslavych, Svyatoslav Vsevolodych and Andrey Bogolyubsky could claim the Kyiv throne. However, the Kyiv boyars invited Mstyslav Izyaslavych, the prince of Volyn, to rule the land. He was famous for defeating Polovtsian khans, he also actively helped his uncle Rostyslav to govern in Kyiv and was essentially his co-ruler. Therefore, having enlisted the support of Yaroslav Halytsky and mobilized a small squad, Mstyslav Izyaslavych easily took over the city.

Perhaps the greatest achievement of Mstyslav Izyaslavych at the Grand Prince table was the successful fight against the Polovtsians. In 1168 the prince of Kyiv headed an anti-Polovtsian expedition, in which as many as thirteen princes took part. Mstyslav II gathered Chernihiv, Volyn, Kyiv, Pereyaslav and other princes, and in 1152 he defeated the Polovtsian nomads over Oril and Snoporod, took many prisoners and cattle. He also organized the protection of trade caravans that went along the Zalozny, Solony, and Gretsky roads, where they used to be taken over by the Polovtsians.

Meanwhile, the anti-Kyiv union of Vladimir-Suzdal princes with the Polovtsians was formed in the eastern lands of Rus'. By the end of 1168, 12 princes, as well as their Polovtsian allies, were ready to oppose the Kyiv prince. It was at this time that the formation of a new ethnic group with its own separate political and social system began in the Zalesye. Among its representatives was the grandson of Volodymyr Monomakh, the son of Yuri Dolgorukiy and Polovtsian princess  — Andrey Bogolyubsky (surname from the area Bogolyubovo). According to Vasily Klyuchevsky, he was "a true northern prince, a true Suzdal man from Zalesye in his habits and concepts and in his political upbringing."

In 1169, Andrey Bogolyubsky gathered a large army, which included Murom, Smolensk, Polotsk, Chernihiv, and Dorogobuzh princes, and marched on Kyiv. "A whole cloud of princes of the Rus' moved to destroy Kyiv to the glory of its northern rival," as Mykhailo Hrushevsky described the event. The onslaugh was not successful, but Mstyslav's forces were small, as he sent the troops to help his son in Novgorod just before the attack. On the advice of his wife, who was in Kyiv, the Grand Prince fled the city and went to Volyn' to gather some help.

The course of the siege and assault 
After the long siege, the defenders of the city surrendered on 8 March, 1169. According to the ancient tradition and unwritten rules of Rus', the people of Kyiv believed that the new prince came to rule the capital, so they decided to rely on the mercy of the victors. "Mercy" turned out to be ruthless as Kyiv was subjected to unprecedented devastation for two days, neither women nor children were spared. Properties and residential neighborhoods were looted, a large number of churches and monasteries were burned. Not only private property was taken out of Kyiv, but also icons, chasubles and bells. The Holy Icon of the Mother of God was also stolen – it would later be called the "Vladimir Icon of the Blessed Virgin Mary" and become the greatest shrine of the Russian Empire. For the first time in centuries, the "mother of Rus' cities" was so ruthlessly destroyed. Kyiv has not yet suffered such destruction even from the Polovtsians.

According to Lev Gumilev, the Kyiv pogrom testified to the loss of a sense of ethnic and state unity with Rus' among the population of eastern Rus'. In 1169, after capturing Kyiv, Andrey gave the city for three days of looting and plundering to his soldiers. It was accepted to treat cities this way only when dealing with foreign settlements – until now. Such a practice has never spread to Rus' cities under any circumstances by that time. Andrey Bogolyubsky's order shows, from Lev Gumilev's point of view, that for him and his army (that is, Suzdal, Chernihiv and Smolyan soldiers) Kyiv was as foreign as any German or Polish castle.

After that, Andrew Bogolyubsky put his younger brother Gleb Yurievich, prince of Pereyaslav, on the throne of Kyiv.

Further attack on Rus' 
The assumption that Andrey Bogolyubsky was creating a new state in the east and had not claimed the throne of Kyiv is backed up by the fact that he did not remain in power in Kyiv after his conquest. The Russian historian Klyuchevsky called the Suzdal prince Andrei Bogolyubsky the first prince of the future Muscovites: "With Andrey Bogolyubsky, velikoros (the russian) had entered the historical arena." This is confirmed by the chronicles: they call the Galician-Volyn prince Roman Mstislavych "the autocrat of all Rus'", while Andrey Bogolyubsky is called "the autocrat of the whole Suzdal land". 
In 1170 Bogolyubsky sent troops under the leadership of his son Roman to the second outpost of Rus – Novgorod. The formal reason was the dispute over the "Dvina duty", which Novgorod received from the Finno-Ugric countries, and which from 1169 Dvina started to pay to Suzdal. On 22 February, 1170, a united army of Suzdal, Murom, Polotsk, Pereyaslav and others surrounded the city. However, Novgorod persevered. Then Andrey Bogolyubsky applied an economic blockade against Novgorod, and six months later the people of Novgorod asked for peace and the prince to the throne.

Meanwhile, Mstyslav, having gathered troops in early 1170, went to Kyiv. Gleb Yuriyovych, unable to defend himself and lacking the support of the local population, went to Pereyaslav and asked for the Polovtsians' help, while his opponent entered the city. However, Mstyslav's stay in Kyiv turned out to be short. Once again, having left the Grand Prince table to get new troops in Volhynia, Mstyslav fell ill and died. His work was continued by cousins – princes Rostislavichi.

Trying to finally subdue Kyiv, Andrey Bogolyubsky sent a huge at the time army (50,000 soldiers). On the night of 19 December, 1173, near Vyshhorod, this army was completely defeated by the Ukrainians under the command of Mstyslav Rostyslavych and the Lutsk prince Yaroslav Izyaslavych, who then became the Grand Prince of Kyiv.

In 1174, as a result of internal strife, conspirators led by the boyar Petr Kuchka killed Andrey Bogolyubsky in Suzdal, and after several years of struggle, the latter's brother, Vsevolod the Big Nest, ascended the throne. Vsevolod focused his efforts on internal affairs and did not interfere in Kyiv's affairs.

Although the direct interference of the Suzdal princes in Ukrainian affairs ceased with the death of Andrey, his successor, Vsevolod, constantly intrigued among the princes and incited them against each other.

Aftermath 
After the terrible pillaging of 1169, Kyiv lost its significance as the capital of the Old Kyiv state. Although the interprincely fight for Kyiv continued until the Tatar campaign of 1240.

For one hundred years since the death of Vsevolod II 1146 in Kyiv there were: 47 reigns, 24 princes of 7 lines and 3 dynasties; of which one was in power 7 times, 5 of them – 3 times, 8 of them – twice. Depending on the duration of rule: one – 13 years, one – 6 years, two – 5 years, 4 – 4 years, 3 – 3 years, 7 – 2 years and 36 – 1 year. The Grand Princedom became a nominal title. Having seized Kyiv, the princes negotiated with other contenders and ceded Kyiv land in their favor, giving them one city after another, and finally Kyiv was almost landless. 
At the same time, a new threat was looming from the east – the Golden Horde. After the prince's meeting in Kyiv, the Galician prince and son-in-law of the Polovtsian khan Kotyan Mstyslav Mstyslavych persuaded the princes of Kyiv and Chernihiv to act together against the Mongols – "Tatars". Yuri Vsevolodovich, Grand Prince of Suzdal, did not join the march, formally sending to the aid of the Rus' army his nephew, Prince Vasily Konstantinovich of Rostov, who, however, was late to join the main groups. Most of the princes and their army died during the battle of Kalka. After that, the Kingdom of Ruthenia (Kingdom of Galicia–Volhynia) declared itself as the successor of the Kyiv State. And at the turn of 1239–1240 Kyiv was already under the rule of the Grand Prince of Kyiv Danylo Romanovych. However the city was not able to recover from the pillaging even seventy years later. As the chronicler writes: "Suzdal destroyed Kyiv so much in 1169 that the Tatars had nothing to destroy in 1240."

Mykhailo Vsevolodovych Chernihivsky was the prince of Kyiv for some time, but was later killed by the Tatars for public disobedience. Instead,Yaroslav Vsevolodovych, the prince of Vladimir-Suzdal region, was one of the first princes of the Kyiv tradition to receive the khan's "label", thus recognizing the Horde statesman as suzerain. In 1243 he received a label from the Khan's grace for the Kyiv Grand Princedom, but did not go to Kyiv installing a deputy boyarin there instead. He did not care about the affairs of the distant Kyiv region at all, and for this reason he got another, more convenient label, in 1246  – this time for the great reign of Vladimir. He died suddenly the same year (probably poisoned in the Horde).

References 

Conflicts in 1169
Battles involving Kievan Rus'
History of Kyiv